Clorinda "Linda" Fiorentino (born March 9, 1958 or 1960) is an American former actress. Fiorentino made her screen debut with a leading role in the 1985 coming-of-age drama film Vision Quest, followed that same year with a lead role in the action film Gotcha! and an appearance in the film After Hours. 

Fiorentino gained attention for her lead roles in the erotic thriller Jade (1995), the science-fiction action comedy film Men in Black (1997) and the fantasy comedy Dogma (1999). For her performance in the 1994 film The Last Seduction, she won the New York Film Critics Circle Award for Best Actress, the London Film Critics' Circle Award for Actress of the Year, and was nominated for the BAFTA Award for Best Actress in a Leading Role.

Early life and education
One of either seven or eight children in an Italian-American family, Fiorentino was born in South Philadelphia, Pennsylvania. She was raised in South Philadelphia and later moved with her family to the Turnersville section of Washington Township in nearby South Jersey. 

In 1976, Fiorentino graduated from Washington Township High School in Sewell, New Jersey.  She began performing in plays at Rosemont College in suburban Philadelphia, from which she graduated in 1980 with a Bachelor of Arts degree in political science. She trained at the Circle in the Square Theater School in Manhattan while working as a bartender at the nightclub Kamikaze, where Bruce Willis also worked.

Career
Fiorentino got her first professional role in 1985 when she starred in Vision Quest as "Carla". Film critic Roger Ebert said of the newcomer, "Without having met the actress, it's impossible for me to speculate on how much of Carla is original work and how much is Fiorentino's personality. What comes across, though, is a woman who is enigmatic without being egotistical, detached without being cold, self-reliant without being suspicious. She has a way of talking - kind of deliberately objective - that makes you listen to everything she says." In a 1994 appearance on Late Show with David Letterman, Fiorentino said she chose to stop acting for a period of time after Warner Bros. executive Mark Canton told her during the filming of Vision Quest, "you have a great ass, but I think your jeans need to be tighter." She said she returned to acting later to pay off mounting credit card debt.

In 1985 she starred in the espionage comedy film Gotcha! which was filmed in Los Angeles, California; Paris, France; and Berlin, Germany. Her co-star, Anthony Edwards, later directed her in Charlie's Ghost Story. 

After having taken various roles she next received accolades for her performance in director John Dahl's 1994 neo noir film The Last Seduction, playing the murderous femme fatale, Bridget. Her performance won the New York Film Critics Circle Award for Best Actress and the London Film Critics' Circle Award for Actress of the Year, and was nominated for the BAFTA Award for Best Actress in a Leading Role. The film was shown on television prior its cinemic release, thus making her ineligible for an Oscar nomination.  She followed this as the femme fatale in the 1995 erotic thriller Jade, a critical and box-office failure. She later worked again with Dahl on his film Unforgettable (1996).

Fiorentino played the female lead in the highly successful Men in Black in 1997, then appeared in the direct-to-video Body Count in 1998. In 1999, she starred in Dogma as an abortion clinic employee tasked with saving the world.  Fiorentino did not get along with director Kevin Smith, which garnered negative press for her.

After a co-starring role with Paul Newman in the 2000 heist film Where the Money Is, and a lead role as the titular character in the 2002 film Liberty Stands Still, Fiorentino's career slowed to a halt. She was in talks to star in a series being prepared by Tom Fontana, but ultimately did not take the project. Fiorentino was attached to a Georgia O'Keeffe biographical drama called Till the End of Time, but the project stalled when Fiorentino had a falling out with German producer Karel Dirka.

In 2007, Fiorentino optioned the rights to a screenplay about Russian poet Anna Akhmatova, with plans to produce and to possibly star in and direct, but the project was dropped. During this period, she was reported to be developing two documentaries, neither of which moved forward.

Her final screen role to date was a supporting character in Once More with Feeling, released direct to video in 2009.

Personal life
Fiorentino married film director and writer John Byrum who she had previously worked with on the unfinished movie The War at Home, on June 23, 1992. The couple divorced in 1993, after a year of marriage. 

She later had a relationship with Los Angeles private investigator Anthony Pellicano and dated former Federal Bureau of Investigation agent Mark T. Rossini.  In 2009, Rossini pleaded guilty to illegally accessing FBI computers during the prosecution of Pellicano. Law enforcement officials said Fiorentino wanted to assist Pellicano's defense. According to prosecutors, Fiorentino was then dating Rossini, told Rossini she was researching a screenplay based on Pellicano's case. Rossini conducted searches of government computers for information related to the case and passed the results to Fiorentino, who then handed the files over to Pellicano's lawyers in a failed effort to help Pellicano avoid a 15-year prison sentence.

Filmography

References

External links

 Includes link to text transcript. Transcript archived from the original on November 28, 2017.

Living people
American film actresses
American television actresses
American people of Italian descent
Actresses from New Jersey
Rosemont College alumni
Actresses from Philadelphia
Circle in the Square Theatre School alumni
20th-century American actresses
21st-century American actresses
Independent Spirit Award for Best Female Lead winners
People from Washington Township, Gloucester County, New Jersey
Washington Township High School (New Jersey) alumni
1958 births